Fāṭimah bint Muḥammad al-Taymī was the third influential wife of the Abbasid caliph al-Mansur. She was the mother of famous prince Sulayman.

Biography
Fatimah belonged to Banu Taym clan of the Quraysh. She was also known as 'Fatimah al-Talhi'. Before her marriage to Caliph al-Mansur, her husband was married to Arwa.

Al-Mansur's first wife was Arwa, known as Umm Musa, whose lineage went back to the kings of Himyar. She had two sons, Muhammad (the future caliph al-Mahdi) and Ja'far. According to their pre-marital agreement, while Arwa was still alive, al-Mansur had no right to take other wives and have concubines. Al-Mansur tried to annul this agreement several times, but Arwa always managed to convince the judges to not accede to the caliph's attempts. Arwa died in 764. After her death, al-Mansur married Hammadah and Fatimah.

Fatimah became the third wife of al-Mansur. Her father was Muhammad, a descendant of a prominent companion of the Islamic prophet Muhammad, Talhah ibn Ubaydallah. She had three sons, Sulayman, Isa, and Ya'qub.

Fatimah lived most of her life in the caliphal palace. She became the most influential wife of al-Mansur after Arwa. Her sons were not in the line of succession as al-Mansur kept his eldest sons as heirs. However, Fatimah's sons became important officials of the Caliphate.

Family
Fatimah was related to the several members of the  Abbasid ruling house of the Caliphate.

References

Sources
 Abbott, Nabia (1946). Two Queens of Baghdad: Mother and Wife of Hārūn Al Rashīd. University of Chicago Press. pp. 15–16
 
 
 Al-Tabari; Hugh Kennedy (1990). The History of al-Tabari Vol. 29: Al-Mansur and al-Mahdi A.D. 763-786/A.H. 146–169. SUNY series in Near Eastern Studies. State University of New York Press. pp. 148–49.

8th-century births
8th-century deaths
8th-century women from the Abbasid Caliphate
Wives of Abbasid caliphs
8th-century people from the Abbasid Caliphate
Arab princesses
8th-century Arabs